Download Series Volume 9 is a live album by the rock band the Grateful Dead. It was released on January 3, 2006 as a digital download.  It contains two complete concerts on four discs – April 2 and 3, 1989 at Pittsburgh's  Civic Arena (the Igloo).

Volume 9 was mastered in HDCD by Jeffrey Norman.

Track listing

Disc one
April 2, 1989
First set:
 "Iko Iko" (Crawford, B. Hawkins, R. Hawkins, Johnson) – 5:57
 "Little Red Rooster" (Dixon) – 9:26
 "Dire Wolf" (Garcia, Hunter) – 3:55
 "It's All Over Now" (B. Womack, S. Womack) – 8:40
 "We Can Run" (Mydland, Barlow) – 5:11
 "Brown-Eyed Women" (Garcia, Hunter) – 5:17
 "Queen Jane Approximately" (Dylan) – 6:48
 "Tennessee Jed" > (Garcia, Hunter) – 7:39
 "The Music Never Stopped" (Weir, Barlow) – 8:04
 Encore: "It's All Over Now, Baby Blue" (Dylan) – 7:45
Disc two
Second set:
 "Shakedown Street" (Garcia, Hunter) – 12:05
 "Man Smart, Woman Smarter" (Span) – 8:18
 "Foolish Heart" > (Garcia, Hunter) – 7:51 >
 "Rhythm Devils" > (Hart, Kreutzmann) – 10:53
 "Space" > (Garcia, Lesh, Hunter) – 8:58
 "The Wheel" > (Garcia, Hunter) – 4:27
 "Dear Mr. Fantasy" > (Winwood, Capaldi, Wood) – 5:08
 "Hey Jude" > (Lennon, McCartney) – 2:39
 "Around and Around" > (Berry) – 3:50
 "Goin' Down the Road Feeling Bad" > (Trad. Arr. By Grateful Dead) – 5:44
 "Turn On Your Lovelight" (Scott, Malone) – 5:44
Disc three
April 3, 1989
First set:
 "Greatest Story Ever Told" > (Weir, Barlow) – 4:13
 "Bertha" > (Garcia, Hunter) – 7:18
 "Walking Blues" (Johnson) – 6:48
 "Jack-a-Roe" (Trad. Arr. By Grateful Dead) – 5:43
 "El Paso" (Robbins) – 5:31
 "Built to Last" (Garcia, Hunter) – 5:26
 "Victim or the Crime" (Weir, Graham) – 7:38
 "Just Like Tom Thumb's Blues" (Dylan) – 5:06
 "Don't Ease Me In" (Trad. Arr. By Grateful Dead) – 3:26
Second set:
 "Blow Away" (Mydland, Barlow) – 8:12
Encore: 
 "Johnny B. Goode" > (Berry) – 4:30
 "Black Muddy River" (Garcia, Hunter) – 6:44

Disc four
Second set, continued:
 "Estimated Prophet" > (Weir, Barlow) – 10:46
 "Crazy Fingers" > (Garcia, Hunter) – 8:14
 "Uncle John's Band" > (Garcia, Hunter) – 11:46
 "Rhythm Devils" > (Hart, Kreutzmann) – 7:24
 "Space" > (Garcia, Lesh, Weir) – 9:37
 "Gimme Some Lovin' " > (S. Winwood, M. Winwood, Davis) – 5:11
 "I Need a Miracle" > (Weir, Barlow) – 4:15
 "Stella Blue" > (Garcia, Hunter) – 8:02
 "Sugar Magnolia" (Weir, Hunter) – 8:54

Personnel
Grateful Dead
 Jerry Garcia – lead guitar, vocal
 Mickey Hart – drums
 Bill Kreutzmann – drums
 Phil Lesh – electric bass, vocals
 Brent Mydland – keyboards, vocals
 Bob Weir – rhythm guitar, vocals
Production
 Dan Healy – recording
 Jeffrey Norman – mastering

References

External links
Recordings from the audience are available for these concerts at The Internet Archive

09
2006 live albums